Nemi Chandra Kasliwal (1909-1978) was an Indian politician. He was elected to the Lok Sabha, the lower house of the Parliament of India, from Kota in Rajasthan, as a member of the Indian National Congress.

References

External links
Official biographical sketch in Parliament of India website

India MPs 1952–1957
India MPs 1957–1962
Lok Sabha members from Rajasthan
Rajya Sabha members from Rajasthan
1909 births
1978 deaths
Indian National Congress politicians